Everest Engineering Collee - EEC (former Everest Engineering and Management College) is an educational institute established in 2001 AD. It is currently located in Sanepa, Lalitpur, Nepal. Everest Engineering College (EEC), is one of the pioneer and leading Engineering College in Nepal under the affiliation of Pokhara University. A group of young and profound academicians are leading the college in terms of state-of-the-art pedagogy and the research with the aim to form a center of excellence in technology and innovation.  
Different Engineering Programs at EEC prepare students in different engineering programs and teach them the ways to discover the new trends in their fields. Our management team and faculties are dedicated to create excellent teaching-learning environment with extensive counselling, interactions and project works leading to publications within and outside of the college. Our graduates have proven extraordinary track record of placement in job market nationally and internationally. The quality of education at EEC is competitive for higher studies in research level at different internationally recognised institution worldwide.

The college offers courses in:
  ENGINEERING:
Bachelor of Civil Engineering (BE Civil)
 Bachelor of Computer Engineering (BE Computer)
Bachelor of IT Engineering (BE IT)
Scholarship Schemes

EEC provides broad class of scholarships under following categories:-

Nepal Government Scholarships

EEC Provides full scholarship to 10% students under the rules of education ministry through  Pokhara University. Scholarship awardee will get full waiver on admission, tuition & semester fees.

Outstanding Scholarship

EEC provides full tuition fee scholarship for the University toppers securing (SGPA 4.0) in semester end university examination for the next one semester.

Program Topper Scholarship

EEC Provides 50% tuition fee scholarship in each program topper for next one semester.  Program topper scholarship recipient must have secured minimum SGPA 3.0 in semester end university examination.

Admission Scholarship

This Scholarship is awarded to the meritorious students based on their performance in entrance examination conducted by EEC.

Admission Eligibility

Students seeking admission in different bachelor level engineering programs must have passed Secondary Level (NEB 12) in Science program (Physical or Biogroup), or Diploma in Engineering or equivalent, from a recognized institution, securing at least second division or 45% in old system and minimum of Grade C in each of the subjects in new letter grading system.

See also 

 List of universities and colleges in Nepal

References 

Engineering universities and colleges in Nepal
2001 establishments in Nepal